Sir Edward Knatchbull, 8th Baronet (22 May 1758 – 1 September 1819) was a British politician and baronet.

Background
He was the only surviving son of Sir Edward Knatchbull, 7th Baronet and his wife Grace Legge, second daughter of William Legge. In 1789, he succeeded his father as baronet. Knatchbull was educated at Tunbridge and Winchester School. He matriculated at Christ Church, Oxford in 1777 and received a Doctorate of Civil Law by the University of Oxford in 1810.

Career
Knatchbull was High Sheriff of Kent in 1785. He entered the British House of Commons in 1790, sitting for Kent until 1802. He represented the constituency as Member of Parliament (MP) again from 1806 until his death in 1819.
He was listed 'friendly' to the abolition of the slave trade and on 27 April 1792 he proposed that the abolition of the slave trade, which he supported, should nevertheless be deferred until 1796 and carried his point by 151 votes to 132.  The 1792 Slave Trade Bill passed the House of Commons mangled and mutilated by the modifications and amendments of Pitt, it lay for years, in the House of Lords. Biographer William Hague considers the unfinished abolition of the slave trade to be Pitt's greatest failure. It was this gutting of Dundas's plan that caused the Slave Trade Bill to fail. By rejecting the incremental approach in Dundas's 12-point plan, the abolitionists lost their opportunity to win support in the House of Lords.

Family
In July 1780, he married firstly Mary Hugessen, daughter of William Western Hugessen, and had by her a son and two daughters. She died in 1784 and Knatchbull married secondly Frances Graham, daughter of John Graham on 2 June 1785. They had nine children, five sons and four daughters. After her death in 1799, Knatchbull married finally Mary Hawkins, daughter of Thomas Hawkins at St George's, Hanover Square on 13 April 1801. By his third wife he had seven children.

Knatchbull died aged 61, after a short illness, at his son's house at Provender, Kent and was buried in Mersham. He was succeeded in the baronetcy by his oldest son Edward. A younger son was probably John Knatchbull, a naval captain and convict found guilty of murder in 1844; who was one of the earliest to raise in a British court the plea of moral insanity (unsuccessfully).

References

Sources

External links

1758 births
1819 deaths
Alumni of Christ Church, Oxford
Baronets in the Baronetage of England
British MPs 1790–1796
British MPs 1796–1800
High Sheriffs of Kent
Members of the Parliament of Great Britain for English constituencies
Members of the Parliament of the United Kingdom for English constituencies
People educated at Winchester College
UK MPs 1801–1802
UK MPs 1806–1807
UK MPs 1807–1812
UK MPs 1812–1818
UK MPs 1818–1820
Edward